Fair and Warmer is a lost 1919 American silent film directed by Henry Otto starring May Allison and Eugene Pallette. The film was based upon the 1915 play Fair and Warmer by Avery Hopwood.

Plot 
As described in an adaptation published in the film magazine Shadowland, Billy Bartlett (Pallette) suspects his wife Laura (Mayo), who has been spending time with Philip Evans (Buckley), is having an affair. When upstairs neighbors Jack and Blanny Wheeler (Trenton and Allison) visit to play cards, Jack confides in Billy that, whenever he needs an explanation for his absence, he tells his wife he is going to the Mystic Shrine. Jack and Laura leave separately, and Billy and Blanny discuss their mutual suspicions and get drunk. Jack, Laura, and Philip return to the apartment and Billy and Blanny are wrongly accused of being unfaithful. Laura storms out. Two days later, after having movers go to get the furniture, she returns to the apartment after becoming jealous, and discovers Blanny under Billy's bed. However, the maid (Conley) explains that this is all innocent and Blanny was there looking for Jack. Jack overhears, and explains to Blanny that "Mystic Shrine" was his cover for going out to play poker. They reconcile. Laura, deciding to give up the promiscuous Philip, is also reconciled with Billy.

Cast 
May Allison as Blanny Wheeler 
Pell Trenton as Jack Wheeler 
Eugene Pallette as Billy Bartlett 
Christine Mayo as Laura Bartlett 
William Buckley as Philip Evans 
Effie Conley as Tessie

References

External links 

American silent feature films
American black-and-white films
American films based on plays
1910s romance films
Lost American films
Metro Pictures films
American romance films
Films directed by Henry Otto
1910s American films